Chlorocypha cancellata is a species of damselfly in the family Chlorocyphidae. It is found in Cameroon, the Republic of the Congo, the Democratic Republic of the Congo, Equatorial Guinea, Gabon, Guinea, Nigeria, and Uganda. Its natural habitats are subtropical or tropical moist lowland forests and rivers.

References

Chlorocyphidae
Insects described in 1879
Taxonomy articles created by Polbot